Run around or runaround may refer to:

Film and television
 The Runaround (1931 film), an American comedy-drama film
 The Runaround (1946 film), an American mystery film directed by Charles Lamont 
 All Nighter (film) (working title The Runaround), a 2017 American comedy directed by Gavin Wiesen
 Runaround (game show), a 1972–1973 American children's television show
 Runaround (British game show), a 1975–1981 adaptation of the American show

Music
 "Run-Around" (song), by Blues Traveler, 1995
 "Runaround", a song by the Fleetwoods, 1960
 "Run Around", a song by Jefferson Airplane from Jefferson Airplane Takes Off, 1966
 "Runaround", a song by Rickie Lee Jones from The Magazine, 1984
 "Runaround", a song by Van Halen from For Unlawful Carnal Knowledge, 1991

Other uses
 "Runaround" (story), a 1942 short story by Isaac Asimov
 Runaround (typography), where text conforms to an irregular shape or intrusion
 Run around coil, a heat exchanger system
 Run around, a maneuver for reversing a train's direction; see Glossary of rail terminology 
 Run-around loop, a track arrangement allowing this maneuver